The Christopher Street Pier is a group of piers in Hudson River Park on the Hudson River waterfront of Greenwich Village, Manhattan, New York City, numbered 42, 45, 46, and 51. "Christopher Street Pier" usually refers specifically to Pier 45 opposite W. 10th Street, which can be reached by crossing West Street.

Once a working part of the New York waterfront, the Pier had physically decayed by the 1980s and had developed a vibrant gay social scene for "cruising". Since renovations and the opening of the Hudson River Park's new Greenwich Village segment in 2003, it has retained its role as a gathering place for gay youth from New York City and New Jersey who have been congregating at the pier since the 1970s.

However, residents of Christopher Street have complained about noisy teenagers leaving the park after its 1 a.m. curfew. Neighborhood leaders and speculators in the area's townhouse market make frequent use of the term "unruly" to describe the pier's users, many of whom are African American or Latino gay youth.  Opponents of plans to displace the pier's users have sometimes accused neighborhood leaders and speculators of employing racist code to solicit support for their planned changes. Community residents created a new plan in 2005 to have the Park Enforcement Patrol escort the teens to the 14th and Hudson Street exits. According to an article in AM New York Metro, "A proposal by Connie Fishman ... to barricade the park’s Christopher St. exit at 1 a.m., when the Hudson River Park closes ... and thus reduce late-night noise and crowding on Christopher St." The teenage users of the park responded angrily to the proposed restrictions on the Christopher Street exit and asked instead for the curfew to be moved to 4 a.m., arguing that there will be less of a crowd leaving the park at that time. A group called FIERCE (Fabulous Independent Educated Radicals for Community Empowerment) has been helping LGBT youth fight for later curfews at Christopher Street Pier; a 2001 film showcased the group's campaign to save the pier.

The state's first memorial to the LGBT community was dedicated in June 2018, at the Hudson River Park near the Christopher Street Pier. The memorial, an abstract work by Anthony Goicolea, consists of nine boulders arranged in a circle. The memorial honors the victims of the 2016 Orlando nightclub shooting, most of whom were gay.

References

Transportation buildings and structures in Manhattan
Christopher Street
Hudson River Park
West Side Highway
Redeveloped ports and waterfronts in the United States
Piers in New York City